Monia Chokri (born 27 June 1982) is a Canadian actress and film director.

Life and career
Born in Quebec City in 1982, she began her acting career after she completed her studies at Montreal's Conservatory of Dramatic Arts in 2005. Her mother is of Scottish origin through Scandinavian ancestors, while her father is descended from Tunisian Berber roots.

In addition to having played in several theatre productions in Montreal, she has received notable roles in films presented at the Cannes Film Festival directed by Québécois filmmakers who are better known outside of Canada, namely Denys Arcand and Xavier Dolan. In Heartbeats, she played Marie, a young woman who falls in love with the same man as her gay male best friend Francis, played by Dolan, who also directed. The quality of her acting has been noted by critics, notably in Les Inrockuptibles and Le Monde.

At the end of 2010, the readers of Les Inrockuptibles named her #4 on their list of the top actresses of the year for her performance in Heartbeats.

Her debut as a director, the short film An Extraordinary Person (Quelqu'un d'extraordinaire), was released in 2013 and won the Prix Jutra for Best Short Film at the 16th Jutra Awards. Her feature debut, A Brother's Love (La femme de mon frère), premiered at the 2019 Cannes Film Festival.

Babysitter, in which she was both the director and an actor, was released in 2022. She received a Canadian Screen Award nomination for Best Lead Performance in a Film at the 11th Canadian Screen Awards in 2023.

Filmography
 Days of Darkness (L'Âge des ténèbres), 2007 - Aziza
 Frédérique au centre, 2008 - Frédérique
 Hier, demain, hier, 2009 - Maya
 Heartbeats (Les Amours imaginaires), 2010 - Marie
 Laurence Anyways, 2012 - Stéfanie Belair
 Clémenceau, 2012 - Charlotte Beauséjour
 Gare du Nord, 2013 - Joan
 Nouvelle adresse, 2014–2015
 Endorphine, 2015
 The Saver, 2015
 Heal the Living, 2016
 A Taste of Ink, 2017 - Julia
 Ravenous (Les Affamés), 2017 - Tania
 Emma Peeters, 2018 - Emma
 A Brother's Love (La femme de mon frère), 2019; as director
 We Are Gold (Nous sommes Gold), 2019 - Marianne
 Before We Explode (Avant qu'on explose), 2019
 Babysitter, 2022 - Nadia; also director
 Falcon Lake, 2022 - Violette

References

External links

 

1983 births
Living people
21st-century Canadian actresses
Actresses from Quebec City
Canadian film actresses
Canadian television actresses
Film directors from Quebec
Canadian women film directors
Canadian stage actresses
French Quebecers
Canadian people of Scottish descent
Canadian people of Tunisian descent
Canadian people of Berber descent